In Turkish, the slogan "Yurtta sulh, cihanda sulh" – "Peace at home, peace in the world" – was first pronounced by Mustafa Kemal Atatürk on 20 April 1931 to the public during his tours of Anatolia. This stance was later integrated and implemented as the foreign policy of the Republic of Turkey.

The original full sentence was "Cumhuriyet Halk Fırkası'nın müstakar umumî siyasetini şu kısa cümle açıkça ifadeye kâfidir zannederim: Yurtta sulh, cihanda sulh için çalışıyoruz." This is translated into English as "To describe the stable and general diplomatic policy of the Republican People's Party, I think this short sentence is enough: We work for peace at home, peace in the world."

"Peace at Home, Peace in the World" is regarded as a central principle of the state administration and any state activities.

The statement refers to peace and comfort domestically as well as international peace and security. This principle is the fundamental basis of domestic and foreign policies.

Due to the order of the words in the statement, an interpretation of the latter is that peace at home ultimately will also lead to peace in the world. As such, any distortion of the former will cause a breach of peace in the world, too. Therefore, this principle can be seen as an implicit threat against other nations not to meddle in Turkey's inner affairs as this would give the Turks the justification to retaliate.

This integrative principle of Kemalism holds that any problem present in the world can do damage to everyone. Therefore, nations should not be indifferent to the problems of other nations.

References

Mustafa Kemal Atatürk
Foreign relations of Turkey
Mottos
Mottos
International relations